Óscar Hernández was the defending champion, but lost in semifinals to Rubén Ramírez Hidalgo.

Júlio Silva defeated Rubén Ramírez Hidalgo 6–2, 6–3 in the final.

Seeds

Draw

Finals

Top half

Bottom half

External links
Main Draw
Qualifying Draw

2005 Singles